Un mundo Perfecto is an Argentinean TV program hosted by comedian and musician Roberto Pettinato and distributed by América TV. The show features interviews with celebrities and members of the public, comedic monologues by the host and music performances. It premiered on March 16, 2009.

External links 
Official site
extremista.com.ar
cordoba.net

2000s Argentine television series
2010s Argentine television series
2009 Argentine television series debuts